Namchö Mingyur Dorje (1645–1667) was a Tibetan tertön or "treasure revealer" in Tibetan Buddhism. His extraordinary "pure vision" revelations, which mostly occurred around the age of 16, are known as the Namchö ( "Sky Dharma" terma. He first transmitted these to his teacher Karma Chakmé (1613-1678), the illustrious Buddhist scholar of the Kagyu school, who wrote them down. The collection of his revelations fill thirteen Tibetan volumes and are the basis of one of the main practice traditions of the Palyul lineage, a major branch of the Nyingma school of Tibetan Buddhism. He was considered to be a reincarnation of Palgyi Senge of Shubu, one of the ministers the 8th-century Tibetan King Trisong Detsen sent to invite Padmasambhava to Tibet. He recognized Kunzang Sherab as the Lineage Holder of the Namchö terma.
Loden Chegse, one of Padmasambhava's eight emanations, had a vision which helped him learn to read and write. At age 7, his Dakini visions helped focus on reliance upon the lama. At age 10, after a vision and with a Dharma Protector's help, he met his root lama Karma Chagme. Karma Chakmé recognized him as manifestation of Padmasambhava, Senge Dradok. Mingyur Dorje revealed the Namchö treasures at age thirteen, which were written down with Karma Chakmé's help while they stayed in retreat together for three years.

He showed signs of illness at age 23, which progressed to his mind stream dissolving in to the great sphere of empty truth with full eight Heruka vision and mandalas.

Variant names 
He was also known as  Drakpo Nuden Tsel, Mingyur Dorje, Terton Mingyur Dorje, and Terton Sherab Mebar.

See also 
 Namchö

Sources

 
 
 
 
 
 
 
 

Short biographies of Mingyur Dorje:
Ein Tibetisches Wunschgebet um Wiedergeburt in der Sukhāvatī by Peter Schwieger (1978). St. Augustin: VGH Wissenschaftsverlag.
 ‘gNam čhos, Die Schriften des Mi 'gyur rdo rĵe (1646-1667)’ by Von. R.O. Meisezahl (1981). Ural-Altaische Jahrbücher, Neue Folge, Wienbaden, Harrassowitz, 1:195-226.
 Recherches sur l’Épopée et le Barde du Tibet. by A. Stein (1959). Paris: Presses Universitaires de France.

References

External links
 
 
 
 
 

 

1645 births
1667 deaths
17th-century Buddhists
Tertöns
Nyingma lamas